Netherby may refer to:

Places
Netherby, Canterbury, a suburb in the town of Ashburton, New Zealand
Netherby, Cumbria
Netherby, Ontario
Netherby, North Yorkshire
Netherby, South Australia
Netherby, Victoria, Australia

Other uses
Netherby (ship), wrecked on King Island, Tasmania in 1866